Kobero–Bugene–Mutukula–Kikagati Road, also Burundi–Tanzania–Uganda Road, is a road in the Kagera Region of Tanzania. The road connects the border towns of Mutukula and Kikagati in Uganda, to the border town of Kobero, in Burundi. The road allows direct access between Uganda and Burundi, promoting exchange of goods and passengers, avoiding routes through Rwanda, where free movement of Ugandan goods and passengers are restricted, since February 2019.

Location
The road starts at Kobero Border Crossing Point, at the international border between Burundi and Tanzania.

At Bugene, the road forks into two. The left fork travels north-westwards for an estimated  to Kikagati, in Isingiro District, at the border between Tanzania and Uganda.

Upgrading to bitumen
Parts of this route corridor in Tanzania are bitumen surfaced. However, the roads in Uganda connecting to this road, are in various stages of disrepair. As of May 2021, the  Masaka–Mutukula Road is described as "in bad shape". As recently as January 2020, the government of Uganda revealed plans to expand and re-surface this road.

Repairs may be required as well to the  road between Kobero Border Crossing Point, in Burundi, to the country's capital city at Gitega.

Way forward
High level teams of politicians and technocrats from the three East African Community member states are scheduled to meet to pave the way forward. It is expected that each country will pay for the portion of this highway that passes through its territory.

See also
 List of roads in Tanzania
 Kagera Region

References

External links
 Construction of Tanzania–Uganda roads expected to begin soon A of 12 February 2021.
 Road Transport in East Africa As of July 2020.

Roads in Tanzania
Kagera Region